Fugging may refer to:

 Fugging, Lower Austria, a village in Lower Austria, formerly known as Fucking until 1836
 Fugging, Upper Austria, a village in Upper Austria, formerly known as Fucking until 2021

See also 
 Fucking (disambiguation)